Multishow is an entertainment channel owned by Canais Globo, Grupo Globo's cable and satellite television channel operator. It was launched in 1991, as one of the company's first four channels (with Telecine, Top Sport – now SporTV – and GNT). A high-definition simulcast was launched on December 15, 2012, at 11:59 pm Brazilian Summer Time (UTC-02), with a live telecast of a Rolling Stones concert at the Prudential Center.

Programming

Original programming
Batom e Parafina
Bastidores
Bicicleta e Melancia
BBB: A Eliminação
Casa Bonita (on hiatus)
Conexões Urbanas
Cilada
De Cara Limpa
Desenrola Aí
Experimente
Extremos
Geleia do Rock
Intercâmbio
Kaiak
Lu Alone
Lugar Incomum
Minha Praia
Morando Sozinho
Na Fama e Na Lama
Nalu pelo Mundo
Não Conta Lá em Casa
No Caminho
Nós 3
Operação S2
Osso Duro
Outros Lugares
Papo Calcinha
Pé no Chão
As Pegadoras
Por Trás da Fama
Reclame
Qual é a Boa?
Quase Anônimos
Que Rock é Esse?
Rock Estrada
Se Joga!
Sensacionalista
Será que Faz Sentido?
TVZ
Top TVZ
TVZ Experimente
TVneja
Clássicos Multishow
Urbano
Vai pra Onde?
Viagem Sem Fim

Non-original programming
Altas Horas (repeat of the previous night's episode on Globo)
Big Brother Brasil (extended coverage)
El Chapulín Colorado
El Chavo del Ocho
Fight Girls
Dead Set
Degrassi: The Next Generation 
Misfits 
My Big Fat Obnoxious Fiancé
Sexytime
Sexcetera
Co-Ed Confidential
The Best Sex Ever
Sex and the City
Cybernet
Beauty and the Geek 
Sex...with Mom and Dad 
The Bad Girls Club 
Being Human

Specials
Multishow Ao Vivo
Multishow Brazilian Music Award
Multishow Registro

Bis

On October 1, 2009, Multishow launched its HDTV channel, Multishow HD. Like other HD channels owned by Globosat at the time (such as Globosat HD, Telecine HD and Premiere FC/Combate HD), instead of being a simulcast of the main channel, it featured a separate, mostly music-oriented lineup, with concerts, documentaries and other music-related programming, but most concerts also air in SD on the main channel. Until the launch of Multishow HD, all of Multishow's HD content aired on Globosat HD, which still broadcasts Multishow's non-music high-definition programming, and some music programs.
On August 27, 2012, in anticipation to the launch of a high-definition simulcast of Multishow, Multishow HD was renamed provisionally Bis Multishow HD ("bis" is the Brazilian term for "encore") and later, on November 2012, renamed as simply Bis. The music-oriented programming of the channel remained mostly unchanged.

Trivia
All foreign-language songs featured on foreign programming and on music videos are subtitled in Portuguese.

References

External links
Multishow website 

Television networks in Brazil
Television stations in Brazil
Globosat
Companies based in Rio de Janeiro (state)
1991 establishments in Brazil
Television channels and stations established in 1991